Samikssha Batnagar is an Indian actress who was seen in various Hindi serials on Star Plus and Zee TV until 2014 in both supporting as well as lead roles. She did a cameo in Madhur Bhandarkar's Calendar Girls, released in the year 2015, marking her Bollywood debut and in 2017 she acted in the Shreyas Talpade-directed movie Poster Boys, opposite Bobby Deol, which is her first lead role opposite a popular actor.

Career

Career in television 
Her biggest break was when she got to play the lead role in Ek Veer Ki Ardaas...Veera (Star Plus). Followed by this, she appeared in Uttaran (Star Plus), Devon Ke Dev...Mahadev (Life OK), Baal Veer (SAB TV), Kum Kum Bhagya (Zee TV) and a few other well-known serials.

Movie debut 
She cameoed in Madhur Bhandarkar's Calendar Girls in 2015. Followed by this, Batnagar finished shooting for the Shreyas Talpade directed Poster Boys, which features Sunny Deol and Bobby Deol as well as Shreyas Talpade himself in the lead role. In the movie, she played the character of Surajmukhi opposite Bobby Deol. The movie released on 8 September 2017. In the span of 2021 and 2022, Batnagar appeared in Black Rose, Dhoop Chhaon and Anth The End. She was praised for her brilliant performance in Anth The End, and was said to have one of the best performances in Dhoop Chhaon.

Filmography

Films

Television

Theatre

References

External links 

 
 

Living people
Place of birth missing (living people)
Indian television actresses
Indian soap opera actresses
Actresses from Dehradun
Year of birth missing (living people)
Actresses in Hindi cinema
Actresses in Hindi television
Indian stage actresses
21st-century Indian actresses